Preet Vihar is a  posh residential colony and one of the 3 administrative subdivision of the East Delhi district in India.

References

Neighbourhoods in Delhi
District subdivisions of Delhi
Cities and towns in East Delhi district